Daniel Edgar Thomas (born 1895; date of death unknown), commonly known as Edgar Thomas, was a Welsh footballer who played as a midfielder and made one appearance for the Wales national team.

Career
Thomas made his first and only international appearance for Wales on 28 February 1925 in the 1924–25 British Home Championship against England. The home match, which was played in Swansea, finished as a 1–2 loss for Wales. He also made twelve appearances for the Welsh amateur team between 1923 and 1934.

Career statistics

International

References

External links
 
 

1895 births
Date of birth missing
Year of death missing
Welsh footballers
Wales international footballers
Wales amateur international footballers
Association football midfielders
Cardiff Camerons F.C. players
Cardiff Corinthians F.C. players
Cardiff City F.C. players
Lovell's Athletic F.C. players
Oswestry Town F.C. players